Andrea Toušková (born 26 September 1992) is a Grand Prix motorcycle racer from Czech Republic.

Career statistics

By season

Races by year

References

External links
 Profile on motogp.com

Czech motorcycle racers
Living people
People from Děčín
1992 births
125cc World Championship riders
Female motorcycle racers
Czech sportswomen
Sportspeople from the Ústí nad Labem Region